Tocatlán is a municipality in Tlaxcala in south-eastern Mexico.

Climate

References

Municipalities of Tlaxcala